Nilto Maciel (January 30, 1945 in Baturité – April 29, 2014) was a Brazilian writer. He wrote poetry and tales in Portuguese, Esperanto, Spanish, Italian and French.

He studied law at the Federal University of Ceará and he lived in Brasilia from 1992 to 2008 where he had several bureaucratic jobs.

He has worked for the publications O Saco and  Literatura.

Works
Itinerário, 1974,
Tempos de Mula Preta, 1981
A Guerra da Donzela,1982
Punhalzinho Cravado de Ódio, 1986
Estaca Zero, 1987
Os Guerreiros de Monte-Mor, 1988
O Cabra que Virou Bode, 1991
As Insolentes Patas do Cão, 1991
Os Varões de Palma, 1994
Navegador, 1996
Babel, contos, 1997
A Rosa Gótica, 1997
Vasto Abismo, 1998
Pescoço de Girafa na Poeira, 1999
A Última Noite de Helena, 2003
Os Luzeiros do Mundo, 2005
Panorama do Conto Cearense, 2005
A Leste da Morte, 2006.
Carnavalha, 2007
Contistas do Ceará: D’A Quinzena ao Caos Portátil, 2008
Contos reunidos (volume I), 2009

Awards 
Prêmio Fundação Cultural de Fortaleza, CE
Prêmio da Secretaria de Cultura e Desporto do Ceará, 1981, 1986
Prêmio VI Prêmio Literário Cidade de Fortaleza, 1996,
Prêmio “Cruz e Sousa”, 1997
Prêmio "Eça de Queiroz",1998
Prêmio “Bolsa Brasília de Produção Literária”, 1999
Prêmio “Brasília de Literatura”, 2003
Prêmio  “Graciliano Ramos”, 2005
Roteiro - Viagem à Amazonia (1978)

References

Sources
Macedo, Dimas. Uma novela de Nilto Maciel, in Leitura e Conjuntura, Secretaria de Cultura e Desporto do Ceará, Fortaleza, 1984, 1.ª ed., e UFC/Casa de José de Alencar, Fortaleza, 1995, 2.ª ed. ver. amp.
 Estaca Zero, in Ossos do Ofício, Editora Oficina, Fortaleza, 1992.
 Contos Picarescos e Alegóricos, in Punhalzinho Cravado de Ódio, Secretaria de Cultura e Desporto, Fortaleza, CE, 1986.
 Visão e Revisão das Letras Cearenses, in A Metáfora do Sol, Ed. Oficina, Fortaleza, CE, 1989.
 Punhalzinho Cravado de Ódio, in Crítica Imperfeita, Imprensa Universitária da UFC, Fortaleza, CE, 2001.

1945 births
2014 deaths
Brazilian male writers
Federal University of Ceará alumni
20th-century Brazilian writers
21st-century Brazilian writers
People from Baturité